Pierre Godart was a Belgian boxer. He competed in the men's lightweight event at the 1928 Summer Olympics.

References

External links
 

Year of birth missing
Year of death missing
Belgian male boxers
Olympic boxers of Belgium
Boxers at the 1928 Summer Olympics
Place of birth missing
Lightweight boxers